Crull is a surname. Notable people with the surname include:

 (1845-1923), German-American Lutheran theologian and writer
Conrad Crull, 17th-century Danish politician
Eldon Jacob Crull (1859–1917), American politician
Elgin English Crull (1908–1976), American politician
Ford Crull (born 1954), American neo-symbolist abstract artist
 (1822-1911), German medical doctor, historian and archivist
Jacob Crull, USL soccer player
Jan Crull Jr., Native American rights advocate, attorney and filmmaker
Jodocus Crull (1660–1713), English writer
Kelly Crull (born 1984), American sportscaster and television personality
 (1862-1925), Dutch jurist and colonial administrator
 (1863-1938), Dutch industrialist
 (1900-1966), Dutch ceramist and humanitarian
Robert Crull (1349–1408), Irish civil servant
Robert de Crull (1329-1378), English king's minister
 (1876-1956), German consular official

References